The Jerusalem railway station (Tahanat HaRakevet Yerushalayim), also known as the Jerusalem–Khan railway station (Tahanat HaRakevet Yerushalayim–HaKhan) after the caravanserai building, now the Khan Theater located across the road, to differentiate it from the Jerusalem–Malha and Jerusalem–Yitzhak Navon stations opened after its closure, is a historic railway station in Jerusalem, located between Hebron Road and Bethlehem Road, near the German Colony. It was part of the Jaffa–Jerusalem railway until its closure in 1998.

In 1998 this railway along with the station were closed and the station was not included in the restoration of the Tel Aviv – Jerusalem line, completed in 2005. The station lay neglected for many years, although the railway yard was used for annual events such as Hebrew Book Week. After undergoing an extensive restoration, it reopened as a culture and entertainment center in May 2013.

History

The idea to build a railway linking the coast with the Jerusalem was first raised in the middle of the 19th century by Dr. Conrad Schick, Moses Montefiore and others. The franchise for laying the railway was obtained from the Ottoman government by Joseph Navon, but due to financial difficulties, he had to sell the franchise to a French company which was set up to build the line – Société du Chemin de Fer Ottoman de Jaffa à Jérusalem et Prolongements.

In 1892, construction of the line from Jaffa to Jerusalem was finally completed. It was built along the "donkeys' trail", an ancient route ascending to Jerusalem which passed through Nahal Sorek and the Valley of Rephaim. The station was inaugurated on 26 September 1892 in the presence of the city's dignitaries, Jews and Arabs. Among those present at the ceremony was Eliezer Ben Yehuda, the reviver of the Hebrew language, which gave the train the literal name of – horse of the steel in Hebrew as the word Rakevet had not yet been created.

The station operated almost continuously until 1948, when traffic stopped on the Jaffa–Jerusalem line due to the 1948 Arab–Israeli War. At the end of the war a section of the track near Beit Safafa, an Arab neighborhood in southeastern Jerusalem, remained under the control of the Jordanian Arab Legion. Following the 1949 Armistice Agreements, it was agreed that Jordan would hand the control of this section of the track to Israel, in order to enable Israel Railways to restart the service to Jerusalem.

As a result, between 1948 and 1967 the Beit Safafa neighborhood was divided; the area south of the railway line was part of the Jordanian controlled West Bank and the railway line itself and small area to the North part of the Israeli controlled section of Jerusalem. The service on the line resumed on August 7, 1949.

In 1959 the railway tracks to Jerusalem underwent extensive renovations, but over time, the number of passengers using the line decreased, especially after the opening of Highway 1. For the majority of the years until the line was finally closed, there was only once or twice daily service to Tel Aviv South railway station (now also closed) and / or Haifa Center (now Center HaShmona) railway station. During the 1990s, due to the poor level of railway tracks maintenance, there were many minor derailments; therefore it was decided to close the section of the Jaffa–Jerusalem railway line from Beit Shemesh railway station along Nahal Sorek to Jerusalem. On 14 August 1998 the last train service left the station, and on 15 August 1998 the station was officially closed. The Beit Shemesh–Jerusalem section was later renovated and reopened in 2005, but only reached the Malha neighborhood, with the railway between the newly-built Malha railway station and the original Jerusalem station having been abandoned. The section from Malha to Beit Shemesh was closed again in 2020 following the COVID-19 pandemic, citing poor ridership and long journey times (especially compared to the new Tel Aviv-Jerusalem railway) and the railway's long, winding course causing excessive damage to train axles.

The station building
The station building is a symmetrical structure containing the station offices, ticket hall and a Concourse. The original building (before later modifications) was identical to the Jaffa railway station building and the original Ramla railway station building, which were all built at the same time. The triangular arches on the roof of the first floor, on both sides of the ticket hall, were built in early 1920s by the British-run Palestine Railway, who managed the railway during the British Mandate of Palestine. The building underwent many renovations over the years, but its basic shape has not changed since 1920.

Restoration and reopening as an entertainment venue

After its closure, the station sat abandoned and suffered from neglect and vandalism. In the 2000s, the area around the station was used for cultural events such as the Jerusalem Film Festival, Jerusalem Jazz Festival and Israel Festival.

In May 2013, the station reopened as HaTakhana HaRishona ("The First Station"), a culture and entertainment venue. The $9.3 million refurbishment was financed by the Jerusalem Municipality and the Jerusalem Development Authority. The 4,000 sq.m. rail yard now features wooden decks, food stalls and umbrella-topped vendor carts. Several restaurants and pubs have opened in the area, and an exhibition of historic photographs is displayed inside the station house. The site hosts musical, literary and artistic events, and adjoins a bike path that links it to the Train Track Park, a walking and cycling path built along the route of the old train tracks. The line's other original terminus, the Jaffa train station, also underwent a similar restoration which was completed in 2009.

Future railway station
The station is expected to return to active railway service as part of National Infrastructure Plan 108, which provides for the extension of the New Tel Aviv–Jerusalem railway to Jerusalem–Malha. The station would be turned into a through station, with the original route to the southwest leading to Malha being complemented by a new route to the northwest, leading to the Jerusalem–Yitzhak Navon railway station (the current terminus) via a completely new underground station in central Jerusalem. However, due to engineering constraints, the revived station would be built in a shallow underground structure (like Navon station, although not nearly as deep), and the railway will only reach surface level at Malha station.

Detailed plans unveiled in November 2021 foresee that the Station's platforms will be located 42 meters underground. The historical station structure's roof will be restored to its original dimensions, but it will remain an entertainment venue; the main entrance will be built in a separate glass structure. Two secondary entrances will be built, one north of the station complex in the Liberty Bell Park, and the other facing Hebron Road, in the extreme south of the station lot.

Like the existing Navon and Malha stations, as well as the planned Jerusalem-Central station, the revived Jerusalem-Khan will have two island platforms servicing four tracks. Each Island platform will be built in a vault, and both vaults will be linked by direct overpasses to escalators and elevators leading to the surface; as opposed to Jerusalem-Navon's structure, where the surface escalators and elevators only lead to a central vault, from which overpasses extend to the platforms.

See also
 Ramla railway station
 Jaffa railway station
 Conrad Schick

References

External links
Official site for renovated station

Railway stations in Jerusalem
Railway stations opened in 1892
Repurposed railway stations
Defunct railway stations in Israel